RCSL may mean:

 RealNetworks Community Source License, a software license
 Rugby Canada Super League, a rugby union competition in Canada
 Red Costarricense de Software Libre, a Costa Rican Free Software advocacy group
 Royal Standard de Liège, a Belgian soccer club from the city of Liège.